Daniel Kilgore may refer to:
Daniel Kilgore (American football) (born 1987), American football player
Daniel Kilgore (politician) (1793–1851), United States representative from Ohio
Daniel Kilgore (comics), the title character of the comic book series Haunt